Oxytenis is a genus of moths in the family Saturniidae and subfamily Oxyteninae. They are also known as jigsaw emperor moths. he genus was erected by Jacob Hübner in 1819. During its larval form, it has large eyespots on the front of its head in an attempt to mimic a snake. The larva has unusual, large, almost wing-like, fleshy protrusions on either side.

Species
Oxytenis albilunulata Schaus, 1912
Oxytenis angulata (Cramer, 1775)
Oxytenis aravaca Jordan, 1924
Oxytenis beprea H. Druce, 1886
Oxytenis bicornis Jordan, 1924
Oxytenis epiphaea Jordan, 1924
Oxytenis erosa Jordan, 1924
Oxytenis ferruginea (Walker, 1855)
Oxytenis gigantea (H. Druce, 1890)
Oxytenis leda H. Druce, 1906
Oxytenis mirabilis (Cramer, 1780)
Oxytenis modestia (Cramer, 1780)
Oxytenis naemia H. Druce, 1906
Oxytenis nubila Jordan, 1924
Oxytenis peregrina (Cramer, 1780)
Oxytenis plettina Jordan, 1924
Oxytenis sobrina Jordan, 1924
Oxytenis spadix Jordan, 1924
Oxytenis zerbina (Cramer, 1780)

References

Oxyteninae
Moth genera
Taxa named by Jacob Hübner